Jowharin (also Romanized as Jowharīn) is a village in the Dashtabi-ye Gharbi Rural District, Dashtabi District, Buin Zahra County, Qazvin Province, Iran. At the 2006 census, its population was 653, in 173 families.

References 

Populated places in Buin Zahra County